Simona Halep won the title, defeating defending champion Kateřina Siniaková in the final, 6–1, 2–6, 6–0.

Seeds

Draw

Finals

Top half

Bottom half

Qualifying

Seeds

Qualifiers

Qualifying draw

First qualifier

Second qualifier

Third qualifier

Fourth qualifier

References
 Main draw
 Qualifying draw

WTA Shenzhen Open – Singles
2018 Singles